Incheville is a commune in the Seine-Maritime department in the Normandy region in northern France.

Geography

Heraldry

Population

Places of interest
 The church of St.Leger, dating from the thirteenth century.
 The church of St.Lubin, dating from the twelfth century.
 A twelfth century chapel.
 The ruins of the château de Gousseauville.

See also
Communes of the Seine-Maritime department

References

Communes of Seine-Maritime